Dalton (named after John Dalton) is an ab initio quantum chemistry computer program suite, consisting of the Dalton and LSDalton programs. The Dalton suite is capable of calculating various molecular properties using the Hartree–Fock, MP2, MCSCF and coupled cluster theories. Version 2.0 of DALTON added support for density functional theory calculations. There are many authors, including Trygve Helgaker, Poul Jørgensen and Kenneth Ruud.

Dalton switched to the open source GNU LGPL licence in August 2017.

See also 
 Quantum chemistry software
 Centre for Theoretical and Computational Chemistry

External links
 Dalton project homepage

References

Computational chemistry software